Gregg G. Tallas (born Γρηγόρης Θαλασσινός, Grigoris Thalassinos; January 25, 1909, Athens, Greece – February 1, 1993, Athens) was a film director and film editor. He first worked for Fritz Lang in 1933, as the associate film editor for The Testament of Dr. Mabuse.

Filmography

As Director

1985: Night Train to Terror
1980: Cataclysm (as Greg Tallas)
1968: Kataskopoi ston Saroniko/ Assignment Skybolt
1967: Bikini Paradise
1965: Marc Mato, agente S. 077
1962: Katigoroumenos... o eros (as Gregg Tallas)
1958: Apagorevmeni agapi (as Gregg Tallas)
1957: Agioupa, to koritsi tou kampou
1953: To xypolito tagma /The Barefoot Battalion
1950: Prehistoric Women (as Gregory G. Tallas)
1949: Siren of Atlantis (as Gregg G.Tallas)

External links

References

1909 births
1993 deaths
Greek film directors
Film people from Athens